Emma Sandys (born Mary Ann Emma Sands) (1843 – November 1877) was a 19th-century British Pre-Raphaelite painter.

Biography
Emma Sandys was born in Norwich, where her father, Anthony Sands (1806–1883), gave her some early art lessons. In 1853 the family added a ‘y’ to their surname. She was influenced by her brother Frederick Sandys (1829–1904), one of the Pre-Raphaelite Brotherhood, and his friend Dante Gabriel Rossetti. Her earliest dated painting is marked 1863, and she exhibited her works in both London and Norwich between 1867 and 1874. Her works were mainly portraits in both oil and chalk of children and of young women, often in period or medieval clothing, against backgrounds of brightly coloured flowers. Emma Sandys did most of her work around Norwich but may have spent time in the studio of her brother, Frederick Sandys, in London. She died in Norwich in November 1877.

Her works include:

Elaine (National Trust Collection, Wightwick Manor, Wolverhampton.)
Fiammetta
Lady in Yellow Dress (Norwich Castle Museum.)
Viola (Walker Art Gallery, Liverpool.)
La belle jaune giroflée (The Beautiful Wallflower) (KINCM:2005.6134, Ferens Art Gallery)

Gallery

References

External links
 
 The mysterious Emma Sandys Culture and Anarchy
 Emma Sandys Pre-Raphaelite Sisterhood

1842 births
1877 deaths
British women painters
Artists from Norwich
19th-century British women artists
19th-century British painters
Pre-Raphaelite painters
Female Pre-Raphaelite painters